Nations: WWII Fighter Command is a 1999 video game from Psygnosis.

Development
The game was announced in May 1998 and was showcased at the Electronic Entertainment Expo that year.

Reception

Jesse Hiatt from Computer Gaming World gave the game a score of 1 out of 5, criticizing the average graphics, oversimplified flight models, boring missions, and the ineffective controls.

References

1999 video games
Combat flight simulators
Psygnosis games
Video games developed in the United Kingdom
Windows games
Windows-only games
World War II flight simulation video games